The following are California State Militia units that were active in the state of California between 1851 and 1861, prior to the American Civil War.

Volunteer Companies of the California State Militia 1850-1860

Amador County
 Amador Rangers, Jackson, 1858   Utah War
 Volcano Guard, Volcano, 1858   Utah War

Butte County
 Oroville Guard, Oroville, December 22, 1856 - July 5, 1857

Calaveras County
 First Calaveras Guard, Mokelumne Hill, 1852 - 1853 
 Jesus Maria Guard, Jesus Maria, 1854-1857

El Dorado County
 1st Company, Mud Springs 1850 El Dorado Expedition
 2nd Company, Placerville 1850, El Dorado Expedition
 3rd Company, Placerville 1850 El Dorado Expedition
 Placerville Guard, Placerville, 1855  
 Coloma Greys, Coloma, 1857 
 Confidence Guard, Placerville, 1860

Humboldt County
 Union Volunteers, Union, 1855   Klamath War
 Trinity Rangers, Pardee's Ranch, Redwood Creek, 1858   Wintoon War/Bald Hills War
 Humboldt Volunteers, Hydesville, 1860   Bald Hills War

Klamath County
 Klamath Mounted Rangers, Crescent City, 1854-1856  Klamath War
 Coast Rangers, Crescent City, 1854-1855  Klamath War
 Klamath Rifles, Young's Ferry, 1855  Klamath War
 Mounted Coast Rifles, Crescent City, 1855  Klamath War
 Salmon Guard, Sawyers Bar, 1855-1856  Klamath War
 Citizens of Crescent City, Crescent City, 1856

Del Norte County (from 1857) 
 Crescent Rifles, Crescent City, 1856-1861

Los Angeles County
 Los Angeles Guard, Los Angeles, 1853 - 1881  Operated against gangs of robbers or raiding bands of Indians.
 Los Angeles Rangers, Los Angeles, 1853 - 1857  Sheriff's auxiliaries vs organized bands of outlaws
 Monte Rangers, Los Angeles, 1854 - 1859  Operated against gangs of robbers or raiding bands of Indians.
 Ringgold Light Artillery, Los Angeles, 1855 - 1857 
 City Guard, Los Angeles, 1855 - 1861  "suppressing lawlessness"
 Lanceros de Los Angeles, Los Angeles, 1857 - 1861  "for the preservation of order, the chastisement of criminals and the repression of outrages"
 Union Guard, Los Angeles, 1857 - 1859 
 Southern Rifles, Los Angeles, 1857 - 1862

Mariposa County
 Mariposa Battalion, Agua Fria, 1851 Mariposa War
 California State Rangers, Quartzburg, 1853   Hunt for Joaquin Murrieta
 Mariposa Guard, Mariposa, 1856 
 Mariposa Mounted Riflemen, Mariposa, 1858-1861?  Utah War

Nevada County
 Nevada Rifles, Nevada City, 1858-1863   Utah War, Paiute War

Placer County
 Mountain Blues, Iowa Hill, 1855 - 1856 
 Placer Rifles, Auburn, 1856 - 1857

Plumas County
 Plumas Rangers, Quincy, 1855

Sacramento County
 Sutter Rifles, Sacramento, 1852 
 Sacramento Guard, Sacramento, 1855 - 1856 
 Independent City Guard or City Guard, Sacramento, 1856 - 1880  Paiute War
 Sacramento Cadets, Sacramento, 1856-1857

San Bernardino County
 San Bernardino Rough and Ready Cavalry, San Bernardino, 1855-1857  Operated against gangs of robbers or raiding bands of Indians.
 First Light Dragoons, San Bernardino, 1856-1857  Operated against gangs of robbers or raiding bands of Indians.
 San Bernardino Rangers, San Bernardino, 1856-1862  Operated against gangs of robbers or raiding bands of Indians.

San Diego County
 Fitzgerald Volunteers, San Diego, 1851 - 1852  Garra Revolt
 San Diego Guard, San Diego, 1856 - 1863  Operated against gangs of robbers or raiding bands of Indians.

San Francisco County
 First California Guard, San Francisco, 1849-1879  The first artillery company in the California State Militia. Garra Revolt
 Washington Guard, San Francisco, 1849-1851? Garra Revolt
 Empire Guard, San Francisco, 1849/1850?-1851? Garra Revolt
 Eureka Light Horse Guard, San Francisco, 1852-1854 
 First Light Dragoons, San Francisco, 1852-1880 
 Marion Rifles, San Francisco, 1852-1861  
 National Lancers, San Francisco, 1852-1859  
 San Francisco Blues, San Francisco, 1852-1859  
 City Guard, San Francisco, 1854-1880 
 Templar Guard (Shermans Guard), San Francisco, 1854
 National Guard, San Francisco, 1855  
 Sarsfield Guard, San Francisco, 1855 
 Wallace Guard, San Francisco, 1855  
 Washington Continental Guard, San Francisco, 1855  
 Benham Guard, San Francisco, 1856  "State of Insurrection" in San Francisco, 1856.
 Constitution Guard, San Francisco, 1856  "State of Insurrection" in San Francisco, 1856.
 Jackson Guard, San Francisco, 1856  "State of Insurrection" in San Francisco, 1856.
 Jefferson Guard, San Francisco, 1856  "State of Insurrection" in San Francisco, 1856.
 Monroe Guard, San Francisco, 1856  "State of Insurrection" in San Francisco, 1856.
 Union Guard, San Francisco, 1856  "State of Insurrection" in San Francisco, 1856.
 California Fusileers, San Francisco, 1858  
 San Francisco Light Guard, San Francisco, 1858  
 Black Hussars, San Francisco, 1859-1881 
 Carbineers (French Guard), San Francisco, 1859-1862 
 Montgomery Guard, San Francisco, 1859-1880  
 McMahon Guard, San Francisco, 1859-1881 
 California Rifles (French Guard), San Francisco, 1860-1862

San Joaquin County
 San Joaquin Guard, Stockton, 1851 - 1852 
 City Guard, Stockton, 1855 
 Stockton Blues, Stockton, 1857 - 1861  
 San Joaquin Mounted Rifles, Knights Ferry, 1858 - 1862   Utah War

San Luis Obispo County
 San Luis Obispo Guard, San Luis Obispo, 1858

Santa Barbara County
 Santa Barbara Guard, Santa Barbara, 1854 
 Santa Barbara Mounted Riflemen, Santa Barbara, 1854 - 1856

Santa Clara County
 National Guard, San José, 1857-1861

Santa Cruz County
 Crusade Rangers, Watsonville, 1858  Utah War

Sierra County
 Sierra Guard, Downieville, 1854-1859 
 Goodyear's Rifles, Goodyear's Bar, 1854-1860 
 Eureka Blues, Eureka City, 1856 
 Forest Rifles, Forest City, 1856-1866  
 National Guard, Downieville, 1857-1861  
 Gibsonville Blues, Gibsonville, 1858-1861    Utah War
 Mobile Guard, Shady Flat, 1858    Utah War
 Sierra Greys, La Porte, 1858.  Utah War
 Sierra Rangers, Allegheny Town, 1858    Utah War

Siskiyou County
 Siskiyou Guard, Humbug City, 1855-1856 
 Scott River Guard, Scott River, 1856-1857  Disbanded when weapons not delivered.

Sonoma County
 Petaluma Guard, Petaluma, 1856 - 1867 
 Sotoyame Guard, Healdsburg, 1858 - 1860 
 Washington Horse Guard, Santa Rosa, 1859

Stanislaus County
 Stanislaus Guard, Knight's Ferry, 1860 - 1862

Tehama County
 Kibbe Rangers, Red Bluff, 1859-1860  State of California's Pitt River Expedition

Tuolumne County
 Columbia Fusileers, Columbia, 1853 
 Sonora Greys, Sonora, 1854

Trinity County
 Trinity Guard, Weaverville, 1854-1855  Disbanded after weapons destroyed in a fire.
 Kibbe Guard, Weaverville, 1858   Bald Hills War, Wintoon War

Tulare County
 Tulare Mounted Riflemen, Visalia 1856 - 1868   Tule River War

Yuba County
 Independent New York Guard, New York Flat, 1855
 Mountain Riflemen, New York Flat, 1855 - 1857  Opposed Indian hostilities
 Yuba Guard, Yuba County, 1855-1857  Opposed lawlessness, Indian hostilities
 Marysville Rifles, Marysville, 1859-1866  Opposed Indian hostilities
 Downey Guard, Timbuctoo, 1860-1861  Opposed Indian hostilities

References

Sources
 The California State Military Museum, California Militia and National Guard Unit Histories, Index to Militia Units of the State of California 1850-1881
 Inventory of the Military Department. Militia Companies Records, 1849-1880

History of California
California history-related lists
Military history of California